Posyolok Ilyicha is a rural locality (a settlement) in Mozhayskoye Rural Settlement, Kashirsky District, Voronezh Oblast, Russia. The population was 283 as of 2010. There are 3 streets.

Geography 
The settlement is located 25 km south of Kashirskoye (the district's administrative centre) by road. Kommuna is the nearest rural locality.

References 

Rural localities in Kashirsky District, Voronezh Oblast